The U.S. embassy in Karachi was established August 15, 1947 with Edward W. Holmes as Chargé d'Affaires ad interim, pending the appointment of an ambassador. The first ambassador, Paul H. Alling, was appointed on September 20, 1947. Anne W. Patterson was nominated as United States Ambassador to Pakistan in May 2007, replacing Ryan C. Crocker who was appointed United States Ambassador to Iraq after completing three years of service in Pakistan. In 2010, her post was succeeded by Cameron Munter. The American ambassador is based in the U.S. Embassy, Islamabad.

Ambassadors

Notes

See also
Embassy of the United States, Islamabad
Pakistan – United States relations
Foreign relations of Pakistan
Ambassadors of the United States

References
United States Department of State: Background notes on Pakistan

External links
 United States Department of State: Chiefs of Mission for Pakistan
 United States Department of State: Pakistan
 United States Embassy in Islamabad

United States
Pakistan